Don Caballero 2 is the second studio album by American math rock band Don Caballero. It was released in 1995 on Touch and Go Records. The album is the group's longest, clocking in at almost one hour in length.

Critical reception

Ira Robbins, in Trouser Press, wrote that "Don Caballero hasn’t completely sacrificed its softer side to the gods of skronk, and the meditative 'Cold Knees (in April)' suggests the sound of several thumb pianos, arranged by Philip Glass and fingered by Einstürzende Neubauten."

Track listing

The album suffers consistently from a misreading of the track listing on internet sources whereby "Dick Suffers Is Furious with You" and "Cold Knees (in April)" are switched in the order with "P, P, P, Antless" and "Repeat Defender."  However, on careful examination of the CD booklet, the track listing is divided into 4 sections (I. "Stupid Puma" & "please tokio, please THIS IS TOKIO", II. "P, P, P, Antless" & "Repeat Defender", III. "Dick Suffers Is Furious with You" & "Cold Knees (in April)", IV. "Rollerblade Success Story" & "No One Gives a Hoot About FAUX-ASS Nonsense").  The track listing on Touch & Go's website compounds the confusion by offering the song "Cold Knees (in April)" for listening but naming it as "Repeat Defender".

Personnel

Don Caballero 
Damon Che – drums, sound effects
Ian Williams – guitar
Mike Banfield – guitar
Matt Jencik – bass guitar

Additional musicians 
George Draguns – bass guitar
 David Reid – bass guitar

Technical 
Al Sutton – production
Andy Vogt – photography, artwork

References

External links
Don Caballero 2 at Touch and Go Records

Don Caballero albums
1995 albums
Touch and Go Records albums